Mała Słupina is a river of Poland, a tributary of the Radunia near Żukowo.

3Mała Słupina
Rivers of Poland
Rivers of Pomeranian Voivodeship